Siyabonga "Tiger" Mangweni (born 20 June 1980) is a South African former rugby union footballer and currently a coach at the .

Playing career

In 2009, he was a member of the Southern Kings team that played in the 2009 British & Irish Lions tour to South Africa.

He was named in the  wider training squad for the 2013 Super Rugby season, but was subsequently released to the Vodacom Cup squad.

Coaching

He retired as a player at the end of the 2013 season and was appointed the defensive coach for the EP Kings' Vodacom Cup side.

References

South African rugby union coaches
South African rugby union players
Eastern Province Elephants players
Living people
1980 births
Stormers players
Griquas (rugby union) players
Cheetahs (rugby union) players
Bulls (rugby union) players
Blue Bulls players